Ira Reynolds Newble II (born January 20, 1975) is an American former professional basketball player. He played in the NBA with the San Antonio Spurs, Atlanta Hawks, Cleveland Cavaliers, Seattle SuperSonics, and Los Angeles Lakers.

College career
After graduating from Southfield High School in 1993, Newble went to Mississippi Gulf Coast Community College before attending Miami University in Ohio, where he studied sports marketing. As a senior at Miami, he averaged 11.3 points, 7.5 rebounds, and 1.2 assists per game while earning Honorable Mention All-Mid-American Conference honors.

Professional career

Early career
Newble played for three seasons in the International Basketball Association (IBA) and later the Continental Basketball Association (CBA) before playing in 2000 overseas. He also played stints in the CBA in 2001 and the United States Basketball League (USBL) in 2002.

NBA career
Newble signed as a free agent with the NBA's San Antonio Spurs and his NBA debut with in the 2000–2001 season, playing in 27 games, of which he started six. In just under seven minutes per game, he averaged 2.0 points per game (ppg) and 1.3 rebounds per game (rpg). He was waived by the Spurs after the season.

He then signed with the Atlanta Hawks for the 2001–2002 season, and his playing time and production greatly increased. Playing 42 games (starting 35), he played over 30 minutes per game, averaging 8.0 ppg and 5.3 rpg, which would both be career highs for Newble. On April 13, 2002 against the Cleveland Cavaliers, Newble set a then career single-game high with 17 points and a career-high 12 rebounds. The following season, 2002–03, he played in 73 games (starting 45), averaging 7.7 ppg, 3.7 rpg, and a career-high 1.4 assists per game. On April 12, 2003, he set a career personal-best with 21 points against the Washington Wizards, then topped that two days later with 23 against the Orlando Magic.

The Cleveland Cavaliers signed Newble as a free agent in July 2003. In the 2003–04 season, in 64 games (25 as a starter) playing about 19 minutes per game, he averaged 4.0 ppg and 2.4 rpg. In 2004–05, he played a career-high 74 games (starting a career-high 69), averaging 5.9 ppg and 3.0 rpg.

Injuries hampered Newble in the 2005–06 NBA season. He missed 21 games with a right foot strain and missed 14 games with a facial abscess, limiting him to 36 games. In 2006–07, he was limited to only 15 games. In 2007–08, he bounced back, playing in 41 games for the Cavs then, on February 21, 2008, he was traded to the Seattle SuperSonics in a multi-player deal. He was waived by the Sonics one week later after playing just two games. In the 2006–07 NBA season he was a part of the team that won the Eastern Conference Championship.

In March, 2008, Newble signed a 10-day contract with the Los Angeles Lakers. Nine days later, the Lakers signed Newble for the remainder of the season. He played six games for the Lakers, ending his eight-year NBA career with 1,930 points, 1,114 rebounds, 342 assists, 204 steals and 105 blocks in 380 games.

European career
Newble started his professional career overseas in the Cypriot League playing for Keravnos Strovolos. Keravnos won the Cyprus Basketball Division 1 championship in 2000. In March 2009, he signed with Bnei HaSharon from the Israeli BSL for the remainder of the season. He joined the Greek League club Aris Thessaloniki in August 2009.  He signed for Cáceres 2016 Basket in December 2009. Cáceres released him a month later.

Coaching career
In 2011, Newble became an assistant coach of the Canton Charge, the new NBA Development League affiliate of Newble's former team Cleveland Cavaliers.

In 2012, Newble became an assistant coach for the Austin Toros of the NBA Development League. He would continue to coach for the Toros under their last two seasons in that name before being renamed to the Austin Spurs. He coached the Augusta Jaguars briefly before deciding the team and city were horrible. On October 31, 2015, he became an assistant coach for the Bakersfield Jam.

Darfur Campaign 
In 2007, Newble led a campaign to help bring awareness to China's involvement in the Darfur crisis. Newble saw a letter that Aid Still Required had written expressing concern about investments funding the crisis in Darfur. He collected signatures around the league for the letter that then was presented to the Chinese Government and the President of the Olympic Committee for the 2008 Summer Olympic Games.

NBA career statistics

Regular season 

|-
| align="left" | 2000–01
| align="left" | San Antonio
| 27 || 6 || 6.8 || .382 || .444 || .500 || 1.3 || .2 || .1 || .1 || 2.0
|-
| align="left" | 2001–02
| align="left" | Atlanta
| 42 || 35 || 30.3 || .498 || .143 || .852 || 5.3 || 1.1 || .9 || .5 || 8.0
|-
| align="left" | 2002–03
| align="left" | Atlanta
| 73 || 45 || 26.5 || .495 || .381 || .778 || 3.7 || 1.4 || .7 || .4 || 7.7
|-
| align="left" | 2003–04
| align="left" | Cleveland
| 64 || 25 || 19.5 || .391 || .105 || .783 || 2.4 || 1.1 || .4 || .3 || 4.0
|-
| align="left" | 2004–05
| align="left" | Cleveland
| 74 || 69 || 24.8 || .429 || .358 || .797 || 3.0 || 1.2 || .7 || .2 || 5.9
|-
| align="left" | 2005–06
| align="left" | Cleveland
| 36 || 3 || 9.8 || .298 || .231 || .688 || 1.6 || .3 || .1 || .3 || 1.3
|-
| align="left" | 2006–07
| align="left" | Cleveland
| 15 || 1 || 8.6 || .432 || .533 || .600 || 2.0 || .1 || .4 || .0 || 3.1
|-
| align="left" | 2007–08
| align="left" | Cleveland
| 41 || 13 || 15.9 || .449 || .333 || .769 || 2.8 || .3 || .7 || .2 || 4.3
|-
| align="left" | 2007–08
| align="left" | Seattle
| 2 || 0 || 8.5 || .286 || .000 || .000 || .0 || .5 || .0 || .0 || 2.0
|-
| align="left" | 2007–08
| align="left" | L.A. Lakers
| 6 || 0 || 5.2 || .333 || .500 || .000 || 1.8 || .5 || .2 || .2 || 1.2

|- class="sortbottom"
| style="text-align:center;" colspan="2"| Career
| 380 || 197 || 20.1 || .446 || .341 || .778 || 2.9 || .9 || .5 || .3 || 5.1

Playoffs 

|-
| align="left" | 2006
| align="left" | Cleveland
| 5 || 0 || 2.2 || 1.000 || 1.000 || .000 || .4 || .0 || .2 || .0 || 1.4
|-
| align="left" | 2007
| align="left" | Cleveland
| 6 || 0 || 1.7 || .000 || .000 || .000 || .2 || .2 || .0 || .0 || .0
|-
| align="left" | 2008
| align="left" | L.A. Lakers
| 1 || 0 || 1.0 || .000 || .000 || .000 || .0 || .0 || .0 || .0 || .0
|- class="sortbottom"
| style="text-align:center;" colspan="2"| Career
| 12 || 0 || 1.8 || .600 || .333 || .000 || .3 || .1 || .1 || .0 || .6

Notes

External links
ESPN Profile

Diamondsportsgagency.com Profile
Basketpedya.com Profile

1975 births
Living people
African-American basketball coaches
African-American basketball players
American expatriate basketball people in Cyprus
American expatriate basketball people in Israel
American expatriate basketball people in Spain
American men's basketball players
Atlanta Hawks players
Austin Spurs coaches
Austin Toros coaches
Bakersfield Jam coaches
Basketball coaches from Michigan
Basketball players from Detroit
Bnei HaSharon players
Canton Charge coaches
Cleveland Cavaliers players
Flint Fuze players
Grand Rapids Mackers players
Idaho Stampede (CBA) players
Israeli Basketball Premier League players
Junior college men's basketball players in the United States
Keravnos B.C. players
Los Angeles Lakers players
Miami RedHawks men's basketball players
Power forwards (basketball)
San Antonio Spurs players
Seattle SuperSonics players
Small forwards
Sportspeople from Southfield, Michigan
Undrafted National Basketball Association players
21st-century African-American sportspeople
20th-century African-American sportspeople